The following is a list of Arena Football League (AFL) teams. The AFL was a professional indoor American football league based in the United States.

The AFL started play with the 1987 season, featuring the Chicago Bruisers, the Denver Dynamite, the Pittsburgh Gladiators and the Washington Commandos. The Pittsburgh franchise became the Tampa Bay Storm in 1991 – they were the only franchise remaining from the inaugural 1987 season still operating until the 2017 season; after that season, they announced an indefinite suspension of operations, leaving open the possibility of returning in the future if the league were restructured in such a way as to make operation of a franchise potentially profitable.

As of the 2019 season, the final season in league history, 65 different franchises (operating under 85 different names when allowing for a franchise changing city or name) had competed in the AFL, of which 60 either left to compete in another indoor football league, suspended operations, or folded outright. At its height, the AFL featured 19 teams competing in the same season: 2001, 2004 and 2007.

Following the 2019 season, the AFL announced the closure of all its teams, but not the league itself. The league mulled over plans to operate with a touring format, with each week's games in a different arena and no set homes for any of its teams (much like the Premier Lacrosse League, BIG3, and most individual sports); however, league commissioner Randall Boe announced the league's filing for bankruptcy and cessation of operations on November 27, 2019.

Franchises active at the time of the 2019 bankruptcy

Expansions and contractions
The Arena Football League expanded and contracted many times throughout its history. Between 1987 and 2018, every year in the AFL had at least one team fold, relocate, or change names. There were never two consecutive seasons in which the league had exactly the same lineup of cities. The league reached its maximum size in the 2001, 2004 and 2007 seasons, in which 19 teams competed in each instance. The league was then primarily contracting from 2011 to 2018, either dropping teams proving to be financially unfeasible or having teams depart because of concerns about the financial structure or travel distances. In 2019, the league had its first season in which all teams returned from the previous season, where the league had tied a record low of four active members.

List of franchises

Timeline

See also
List of Arena Football League arenas

Notes

References

External links
Arena Football League official website

Teams
Arena Football League